Museum Accreditation in the United States is a lengthy process whereby a museum is recognized as adhering to best standards in the field by the American Alliance of Museums in terms of budget, preservation, and conservation, among other criteria. Fewer than 10% of American museums are so accredited. One reason for this is that, while institutions such as colleges and universities are overseen by the Department of Education, there is no government body, such as a Department of Art, Culture, and Technology, that would oversee museums and their accreditation.

See also
Effects of the Great Recession on museums

References

Accreditation
Museums in the United States